Phrynium is a plant genus native to China, India, Southeast Asia, New Guinea and Melanesia. It was described as a genus in 1797.

Species
The Kew World Checklist includes:

References

External links
 
 
 Phrynium Botanical illustrations

 
Zingiberales genera